The Prix Guy-Mauffette is an award by the Government of Quebec that is part of the Prix du Québec, given to individuals for an outstanding career in the radio and television arts in Quebec. It was first awarded in 2011. It is named in honour of Guy Mauffette (1915–2005).

Guy Mauffette was a pioneer director and radio host in Quebec.

Winners

See also
 History of broadcasting in Canada
 Prix du Québec
 Estelle Mauffette

Government of Quebec
Prix du Québec
Quebec awards

References
  Prix Guy-Mauffette